Anarsia ulmarata is a moth in the family Gelechiidae. It was described by John David Bradley in 1961. It is found on Guadalcanal.

References

ulmarata
Moths described in 1961
Moths of Oceania